Kulman Ghising is the current managing director of Nepal Electricity Authority (NEA). He is known for solving the load-shedding (power cut) problem, whereby, for decades, the country had power outages of up to 18 hours daily, within two months of taking office.

Early life and education
Mr.Ghising was born in Bethan village of Ramechhap District in eastern Nepal, and went to Dahoo Secondary School as a child. He moved to Kathmandu and went to Balsewa Secondary School in Jhochhe, starting in the seventh grade. He graduated high school from Amar Adarsh Secondary School and went to Amrit Science College for the Intermediate degree. He received free scholarship from Regional Institute of Technology in Jamshedpur, India, to become an electrical engineer. He completed his post-graduate studies from Pulchowk Engineering College.

Career
Ghising was appointed the managing director of NEA on 14 September 2016 by a cabinet decision. He had been associated with NEA for over two decades prior to the appointment. At the time of the appointment, he was serving as the project chief of Rahughat Hydroelectricity Project, having been managing director of the Chilime Hydropower Company before that. Experienced in power trade and distribution, he said eliminating load shedding would be one of his main foci, in an interview following his appointment.

Scheduled daily power-cuts called load-shedding, extending up to 18 hours in the dry winter months, had been a persistent problem in Nepal for decades. When Ghising was appointed to lead the NEA, he emphasised better management and more equitable power distribution. By ending the policy of providing 24 hours uninterrupted power supply to a few large industries at the expense of the general public, he immediately eliminated power cuts in the major cities, and reduced power cuts to other parts of the country to around two hours every other day. He overhauled the hydropower generation system storing water during low demand hours, and bringing online power plants that had been inoperative due to poor maintenance. He launched a public awareness campaign to discourage the use of high-power domestic equipment during peak hours. Load-shedding was eliminated across the country, for both residential and industrial sectors by May 2018.

On 11 August 2021, Kul Man Ghising was re-appointed for his second term.

References

Living people
Nepalese engineers
People from Ramechhap District
Pulchowk Campus alumni
Tamang people
1970 births